"Dirty Dancer" is a 2011 song by Enrique Iglesias featuring Usher.

Dirty Dancer may also refer to:

Music
 "Dirty Dancer" (Kingsland Road song), 2014
 "Dirty Dancer", a 1984 song by The Bar Kays from Dangerous
 "Dirty Dancer", a 2010 song by Reggie Sears
 "Dirty Dancer", a 2011 song by Oh My! featuring Scrufizzer

Other
 Dirty Dancer, a 2006 book by Thomas Engström

See also
Dirty Dancing (disambiguation)